House sitter may refer to:

 Someone who guards a house by house sitting
 Housesitter, a 1992 comedy film starring Steve Martin and Goldie Hawn